Marzorati (Marzoratti) is a surname, and may refer to;

 Alfred Marzorati (1881–1955), Belgian lawyer and colonial administrator.
 Gerald Marzorati, sports journalist
 Guido Marzorati (born 1975), guitarist, singer, and songwriter.
 Lino Marzorati (born 1986), Italian footballer
 Pierluigi Marzorati (born 1952), Italian former professional basketball player.